Poppenricht is a municipality  in the district of Amberg-Sulzbach in Bavaria in Germany.

Twin towns
  Krems, Austria

References

Amberg-Sulzbach